Intrigue is a Sámi band formed in 1989 in Kárášjohka / Karasjok, Norway, that sings in North Sami and English.

Awards
In 2003, Intrigue received the Áillohaš Music Award, a Sámi music award conferred by the municipality of Kautokeino and the Kautokeino Sámi Association to honor the significant contributions the recipient or recipients has made to the diverse world of Sámi music.

Discography

Intrigue 1994 

 Is This The End
 Revolution
 Star In The Night
 Iešjávre luntat
 Angel Heart
 Need Your Love
 Liar
 Voodoo Child
 Orbin
 Fight The Evil One
 Change

Heavyjoik 2002 

 Eadni nieida
 Iešjávr' lunttat
 29/Deanu Máijá
 Orbina

Crossover 2003 

 Niegadan
 Duoddara giron
 Engel
 Áibbašan
 Ella (Coversong, written by the Karasjok band Molotov Cocktail)
 Goaskinviellja (Coversong, written by sami-singer Mari Boine)
 Hide
 Crying
 Tundra
 Áillohaš (Coversong/medley, tribute to the sami-artist Áillohaš)
 Sacrificed

Čappa nieida 2011 

 Čappa nieida
 Goahtoeanan
 Álás
 Girdilin

Members 
 Øyvind Karlsen — drums
 Frank Rasmus — bass
 Tore Skoglund — guitar
 Geir Karikoski — guitar
 Kai Somby — vocals

former members 
 Øystein Furuly - Drums
 Steve Strømeng - Keyboard
 Knut E. Bakkevold - Guitar
 Knut Skoglund - Drums
 Bengt Roger Kåven - Bass
 Ove Skollevoll - Bass

References

External links

 Official website

Sámi musical groups
Norwegian musical groups
Áillohaš Music Award winners